"Speak White" is a French-language poem written by Canadian poet Michèle Lalonde in 1968, and condemns the linguistic, cultural, and economic exploitation and oppression of French-speaking Canadians, especially the Québécois, by the English language and Anglo-American culture. The poem was published in 1974 by Quebec publisher L'Héxagone, and was recited by Lalonde during the 1968 performance Chansons et poèmes de résistance (Songs and Poems of the Resistance) in support of the imprisoned Front de libération du Québec (FLQ) leaders Pierre Vallières and Charles Gagnon, and again at the 1980 cultural event Nuit de la poésie (Night of Poetry) in Montréal. Responses to Lalonde's work include a 1980 short film of the same name by directors Pierre Falardeau and Julien Poulin, a number of reinterpretations, and "Speak What," a 1989 political poem by Marco Micone.

Derogatory use of the expression "speak white" 
It is alleged that the first known instance of derogatory use of the phrase "speak white" against French-speaking Canadians occurred on October 12, 1889, when member of the Canadian Liberal party Henri Bourassa was booed by English-speaking members of the parliament and shouted at to "Speak White!" during debates in the Canadian House of Commons on Canada's engagement in the Second Boer War. This is, however, not true, as the Second Boer War was between 1899 and 1902) The controversial Dictionnaire québécois-français has an entry from a November 2, 1893 MacLean's article: "for every twenty French Canadians you encounter in my house or yours, fifteen can affirm that they have been treated to the discreditable 'speak white.'"

On March 7, 2007, journalist Larry Zolf published an article called "Speak White" on CBC News Online, giving anecdotal evidence of Canadian immigrants being told to "speak white" by hostile English-speaking Canadians. In the same article, Zolf also criticizes then-Liberal Party candidate Stéphane Dion, wanting to tell him to "speaking white" for Dion's "mangling the English language," and citing his lack of English proficiency as the reason for the candidate's unpopularity with English-speaking Canadian voters.

Reading and writing the poem 

Written in October 1968, the activist poem "Speak White" by Quebec poet Michèle Lalonde references the expression's derogatory use against French-speaking Canadians, and the work as a whole rejects the imposition of the English language and Anglo-American culture, and denounces the political and economic oppression of the French language and those who speak it. The poem was intended to be read on stage by Canadian comedian Michelle Rossignol during a show entitled Chansons et poèmes de la Résistance (Songs and poems of the resistance), but it was Michele Lalonde who finally recited the poem. The show, which brought together artists including Robert Charlebois, Yvon Deschamps, et Gaston Miron, was organized to support the cause of Pierre Vallières and Charles Gagnon, who had just been imprisoned for their activities within the Front de libération du Québec (FLQ). Both the written poem and its performance were a part of the Quiet Revolution of the 1960s, a cultural movement celebrating French-Canadian language, culture, and identity.

Following the example of the Nègres blancs d'Amérique by Pierre Vallières, Speak White equates the racism endured by Black Americans and the colonization that colonized people were subjected to by colonial empires, to the linguistic discrimination experienced by French-speaking Quebeckers. These two texts are commonly thought to be a part of a movement by nationalist intellectuals to appropriate négritude (movement and usage as a term). Additionally, Lalonde had remarked in a 1968 interview that “language here is equivalent to color for the Black American. The French Language, it is our Black color!” 

However, because the phrase "speak white" has been used by anglophones against francophones since the end of the nineteenth century, the claim that Quebec nationalists have appropriated the négritude movement and term during the 1960s and 1970s must be carefully regarded, if not reconsidered, as this term was historically imposed on them. The expression "speak white" was not coined by nationalist intellectuals, so the parallel between the condition of French-speaking Canadians and Afro-Americans in the United States primarily stems from the use of the expression by Anglophones. The Quebec nationalist discourse of the 1970s was a part of a much broader anti-colonialist vocabulary than solely the question of American Blackness, recognizing, for example, a kinship with the struggles waged against in Algeria and Vietnam, as mentioned in the poem by Michèle Lalonde. 

The Front de libération du Québec (FLQ)'s proximity with revolutionary and anticolonial movements in Cuba, South America, Palestine, and Algeria, as well as with the Black Panthers in the United States, illustrates the extent to which Quebec nationalism in the 1960s and 1970s claimed to be a part of a global anti-imperialist movement, of which négritude was one of many faces.

References

External links
"Speak White" poem translated by Albert Herring

Canadian poems
1980 films
Anti-Quebec sentiment
Francophobia in North America
Canadian short documentary films
Films based on poems
National Film Board of Canada documentaries
Documentary films about racism in Canada
Political catchphrases
Documentary films about words and language
Documentary films about Quebec politics
Linguistic discrimination
Racism in Canada
Films directed by Pierre Falardeau
Language policy in Canada
French-language Canadian films
1980s Canadian films